Skyline Queenstown is a tourist attraction service located in Queenstown, New Zealand. Skyline provides a gondola, with a restaurant at the top station and a luge back to the base station.

History
The prominent hill above Queenstown known as Bob's Peak (itself part of Ben Lomond) was a popular vantage point, but difficult to access due to the steep terrain. Ian Hamilton, a bus company owner, had a road cut in 1961 with a gradient of 1 in 4.5 in places so that he could drive tourists to the view point. Two years after Hamilton's death, Jon Dumble bought his shares and took on two business partners for Skyline Tours. They built a chalet on Bob's Peak, which opened in January 1964. In 1965, planning permission was received to build a gondola, upon which Skyline Enterprises was launched as a public company, which bought out Skyline Tours. Dumble became the company's first managing director.

A luge, inspired by the facility in Ngongotahā near Rotorua, was built in 1998. Since 2011, the gondola can carry mountain bikes up to Bob's Peak.

Description
It has various activities such as a gondola, luge, a mountain biking park, and hiking sites. The main complex features amenities such as a restaurant and bar, cafe and a gift shop.

Queenstown gondola 

The gondola carries visitors to the main Skyline complex; from the viewpoint, it is possible to see across Queenstown, Lake Wakatipu, Coronet Peak, The Remarkables, Walter Peak and Cecil Peak.

Luge 

The luge features two tracks, the Blue Track and Red Track, varying in steepness and corners/turns.

Redevelopment 
In February 2019, the Environment Court approved the redevelopment of Skyline Queenstown. The project includes a new gondola, a multistorey car park and a new main building. In late 2020 the project was paused due to closed borders caused by COVID-19 pandemic restrictions.

References 

Queenstown, New Zealand
1967 establishments in New Zealand
Tourist attractions in Otago
Gondola lifts in New Zealand